Vitorino Máximo de Carvalho Guimarães (Penafiel, 13 November 1876 – 18 October 1957) was a Portuguese economist and politician. He was the son of João Antunes de Sousa Guimarães and  Amélia Augusta de Carvalho.  He entered the School of the Army in 1901, graduating as official of military administration and initiating a career that united a passage in the area of the military administration. He integrated committee to after militate bred for the announcement of the Republic and its implantation. In 1911 he was elected member of the house of representatives to the Constituent Congress, for the electoral circle of Bragança. In 1925, he became Prime Minister of one of the governments of First Portuguese Republic.

References

1876 births
1957 deaths
People from Penafiel
Finance ministers of Portugal
Prime Ministers of Portugal
Government ministers of Portugal
Legislators in Portugal